Burton Leonard is a village and civil parish in the Harrogate district of North Yorkshire, England, and approximately  south from Ripon. In the 2001 Census, the population of the village was 654, which had risen to 690 by the time of the 2011 Census. In 2015, North Yorkshire County Council estimated the population had dropped to 670.

The village is typical of the area, with at its centre a green, one public house, a church, a small primary school, a cricket field and a village shop. Buses run daily from the green to the nearby towns of Harrogate and Ripon.

History
Burton Leonard is mentioned in the Domesday Book as having 30 ploughlands and belonging to King William. The name of Burton derives from the Old English of Burh-Tūn (a fortified manor) and the name of Leonard, in this case, the dedication of the local church.

The Church of St Leonard, is a grade II listed structure that was built in 1878, replacing an earlier structure. Although the current dedication is for St Leonard, as was the dedication in the Late Middle Ages, the former church was dedicated to St Helen. The parish was formerly a peculiar, though now it is in the Diocese of Leeds. The primary school is the Burton Leonard Church of England Primary School, which was rated as outstanding by Ofsted in October 2019.

Burton Leonard has just one pub, the Royal Oak, after the Hare and Hounds closed in 2017 and it was demolished to make way for new housing.

Station lane in the village leads westwards to the hamlet of Wormald Green, where the nearest railway station was. The village has a limited bus service between Ripon and Knaresborough.

The underlying geology of the area is magnesian limestone, which many of the older buildings in the village are constructed of. South of the village is Burton Leonard Lime Quarries SSSI, a  site which supplied lime and building stone up until 1941.

Notable people
David Nobbs, comedy writer, creator of The Fall and Rise of Reginald Perrin, lived in the village.

References

Sources

External links

Villages in North Yorkshire
Civil parishes in North Yorkshire